Khaleqdaad Noori (born 1 January 1984) is an Afghan cricketer. Khaleqdaad is a right-handed batsman who bowls right-arm fast-medium and plays for the Afghanistan national cricket team.

Early career
Khaleqdaad was born in Baghlan, Afghanistan. Khaleqdaad spent much of his early years in refugee camps with his family, fleeing from the Soviet invasion of Afghanistan and the subsequent Civil War that followed the Soviet withdrawal. Khaleqdaad, like many of his teammates learnt the game in neighbouring Pakistan.

Khaleqdaad made his representative debut for Afghanistan against Nowshehra on 15 October 2001 in the Quaid-e-Azam Trophy (Grade II). This game occurred a week into the NATO invasion of Afghanistan.

Khaleqdaad's international debut for Afghanistan came against Oman in the 2004 ACC Trophy. In 2006 he toured England, playing in a single match against the Essex Second XI. Later in 2006, he represented the team in the 2006 ACC Trophy, where he played in 2 matches against Iran and Nepal.

2009–present
Khaleqdaad was a member of Afghanistan's 2009 ICC World Cup Qualifiers squad. He made his List-A debut during the tournament against Kenya and later in the tournament he made his One Day International debut against Scotland, where he took 2/25. To date this is Khaleqdaad's only ODI.

Later, in November 2009, he made his unofficial Twenty20 debut for Afghanistan against China in the 2009 ACC Twenty20 Cup. He later played in the final of the tournament, where Afghanistan defeated the United Arab Emirates by 84 runs.

Prior to Afghanistan's tour of Kenya in October 2010, Khaleqdaad had represented Afghanistan in 6 One Day International's. His debut in first-class cricket came during Afghanistan's tour of Kenya, when Afghanistan played Kenya in the 2009-10 ICC Intercontinental Cup. During the match he took his first 2 first-class wickets, those of Nehemiah Odhiambo and David Obuya.

Family
Khaleqdaad's brother, Allah Dad Noori was the first captain of the Afghanistan national cricket team.

References

External links
Khaleqdaad Noori on Cricinfo
Khaleqdaad Noori on CricketArchive

1984 births
Living people
Pashtun people
Afghan cricketers
Afghanistan One Day International cricketers
Sportspeople from Baghlan